Joseph Tapley Dougherty (November 4, 1898 – April 19, 1978) was an American actor, who provided the original voice of the Warner Bros. animation character, Porky Pig, starting with the character's debut in I Haven't Got a Hat in 1935 through Porky's Romance in 1937. Treg Brown changed his voice for Porky. Due to his stutter, Count Cutelli was brought for additional lines due to the length of the audio and budgetary issues.

After that, Mel Blanc took over the role and voiced Porky for 52 years. Dougherty spoke with a natural stutter which became one of the character's trademarks; Dougherty's inability to control his stutter was a factor in the part being recast. According to Friz Freleng, the director of I Haven't Got a Hat, Dougherty would get nervous every time they said cut. Freleng also called the casting for someone who stuttered and they landed on Dougherty.

Early life and career
Dougherty was born in Missouri. Before becoming an actor, Dougherty attended medical school at the University of Nebraska, where he was a member of the Phi Gamma Delta fraternity. When Friz Freleng needed someone who had stuttering issues do the role of Porky Pig, the casting director hired Dougherty. Dougherty would continue voicing the character from 1935 until 1937 where Mel Blanc took over the role of the character because Dougherty could not control his stuttering issues.

Before he was fired, Count Cutelli was bought in to provide the additional lines for Porky.

Death
Dougherty died on April 19, 1978, in Los Angeles, California from a heart attack. He was 79 years old.

Partial filmography

References

External links
 

1898 births
1978 deaths
People from Missouri
American male voice actors
20th-century American male actors
People with speech impediment
Warner Bros. Cartoons voice actors